Rory McSweeney (born 20 April 1985) is a New Zealand para-athlete, primarily competing in the javelin throw. He represented New Zealand at the 2016 Summer Paralympics in Rio de Janeiro, where he won the bronze medal in the men's javelin throw T44.

Statistics

Javelin throw progression

References

External links
  (archive)
 
 Meet Our Paralympians: Rory McSweeney – Attitude Live video profile

1985 births
Living people
Sportspeople from Wellington City
New Zealand male javelin throwers
Paralympic athletes of New Zealand
Athletes (track and field) at the 2016 Summer Paralympics
Medalists at the 2016 Summer Paralympics
Paralympic bronze medalists for New Zealand
Paralympic medalists in athletics (track and field)